Calan Williams (born 30 June 2000) is an Australian racing driver who is set to compete in the 2023 GT World Challenge Europe Endurance Cup with BMW M Team WRT. He previously competed in the FIA Formula 2 Championship with Trident. He is the champion of the 2017 Australian Formula 3 Premier Series. Williams also raced for Jenzer Motorsport in the FIA Formula 3 Championship during 2020 and 2021.

Early career

Karting 
Williams was a member of the Wanneroo-based Tiger Kart Club, and competed in karting championships across Western Australia, and in several race meetings around the country. His karting career spanned from 2007 until 2014.

Lower formulae

2015 
Having tested a Formula Ford car for the first time in December 2014, Williams debuted in formula racing the following year in Western Australian Formula Ford, where he scored a round win on debut at the Barbagallo Raceway, having finished on the podium in two of the three races. A pole position in the final round followed, as Williams ended up tenth in the standings.

2016 
His first full season of racing came in 2016, where he returned to the Western Australian Formula Ford Championship with Fastlane Racing. Round 1 began with a good qualifying performance, as the Australian lined up third for the first race despite experiencing clutch issues on his flying lap, however the round would not yield a podium finish. Williams took pole for the next race at the Collie Motorplex, although he was penalized with a back-of-the-grid start following an overtake under red flag conditions. He beat the track record in the first two races, but one podium was the maximum of his weekend. The third round brought with it a second-place finish, despite a spin into the gravel in Race 1 setting him to the back of the starting grid for the following race, but it was during the next event that Williams would make use of his pace, missing out on victory by 0.08 seconds in the first pair of races, whilst finishing second again in Race 3. Another second place followed in the penultimate round, but Williams finally managed to score his first win in car racing in the second race, which he followed up by taking another victory to cap off the weekend, which he finished as the round winner. A triple of victories followed in the final round to end the season, which meant that Williams had finished second in the standings, missing out on the title by just eight points to Sam Dicker.

2017 
For the 2017 season, Williams progressed to slicks and wings, driving in the Australian Formula 3 Premier Series with Gilmour Racing. Williams took eleven race wins and 16 podiums, which earned him the championship title with one round to go. During the series, he set the outright lap record at Morgan Park Raceway for the circuit's K configuration, with a laptime of 1:07.948.

Euroformula Open

2018 
After having a meeting with Fortec Motorsport in July 2017, Williams tested with the team in December at the Circuit de Barcelona-Catalunya. He then signed with the team for the opening rounds of the 2018 Euroformula Open Championship, and competed in the Euroformula Winter Series. He completed testing at the Circuito de Jerez and Circuit de Barcelona-Catalunya and placed seventh and ninth in two races at Circuit Paul Ricard. Williams made his debut in Euroformula Open at Estoril Circuit in round one of the 2018 Euroformula Series. He qualified 10th for race 1 of the round, finishing 14th in the race and qualified 9th for race two in which he then finished in 11th place.

Williams had two impressive qualifying efforts at the Monza round of the 2018 season, qualifying 5th for Race 1 and 3rd for Race 2. In the races he suffered early setbacks however, being taken out early in both races, but fought back to finish inside the top ten in both races. He finished race 1 in 10th position and race 2 in 8th after being relegated to the rear end of the field following the early incidents. Williams finished the season in 11th position with 25 points.

2019 
Williams competed again in Euroformula Open in the 2019 season with Fortec Motorsport. Williams had a season best results of 4th and 5th at the 6th round of the championship at the Red Bull Ring.

Toyota Racing Series 

In December 2018, it was announced that Williams would race in the 2019 season of the Toyota Racing Series, held in New Zealand in January and February with MTEC Motorsport. Williams would return to using the number 54 that he had raced with prior to 2017. The Australian finished eighth in the drivers' championship with 183, having finished all but two races in the points.

FIA Formula 3 Championship

2020 
In October 2019, it was announced Williams had signed with Jenzer Motorsport for the 2020 season of the FIA Formula 3 Championship, which he stated was "a huge opportunity". He didn't manage to score any points throughout the campaign however and finished 31st in the standings, with a highest finish of 14th. Despite a number of successful qualifying performances, such as qualifying fifth in Budapest, he ended up behind both of his teammates, Matteo Nannini and Federico Malvestiti.

2021 

Williams was retained by Jenzer Motorsport for the 2021 season, this time partnering Pierre-Louis Chovet and Filip Ugran. After a tough first round of the season where he finished just outside the points in race 2, Williams broke through for his maiden FIA Formula 3 podium and points finish at Le Castellet. Williams qualified on reverse pole for Race 1, where he finished third after trading places for the lead and podium spots throughout the race. Williams followed it up with another points finish in race 2, finishing tenth. In race 3 he finished in his starting grid spot of 12th after the rain-affected race. The Australian's next points finish came at the Red Bull Ring, where he ended up ninth in sunday's race. In the following two rounds Williams would be unable to score points, and at the Circuit de Spa-Francorchamps he was involved in a collision with Amaury Cordeel in the Eau Rouge-Radillion complex. Both drivers escaped the impact without injuries. Williams finished the season without scoring any more points and ended up 19th in the standings, having been the highest-scoring Jenzer driver that season.

FIA Formula 2 Championship

2022 

In January 2022, it was announced that Williams will drive for Trident in the 2022 season of the FIA Formula 2 Championship. Having qualified twelfth on debut, he proceeded to have an uneventful first race, finishing 15th whilst teammate Richard Verschoor was victorious. In the Bahrain feature race Williams started the race well, getting up to sixth by the end of the first lap and staying in the points after his pit stop. However, after a safety car was called late in the race Williams pitted for new tyres, but was forced to retire from the race after the team hadn't fitted a tyre on the car properly, leaving it to bounce off after the Australian had left his pit box. At the following round in Saudi Arabia, Williams managed to qualify in seventh place, giving him the opportunity to start the sprint race from the second row. He would end up losing one position, finishing fourth and thus scoring his first points in the category. A pair of anonymous races at Imola came up next, whereas the round at Barcelona would harbour initial promise, as the Australian qualified tenth, setting him up to start from pole position on Saturday. However, a stall on the formation lap prevented Williams from contending for a podium finish.

In October, Williams and Trident parted ways before the season finale in Yas Marina, citing the need to "focus on the next steps of his motorsport career".

Sportscar racing career

GT World Challenge Europe 
For 2023, Williams moved to sportscar racing, teaming up with BMW M Team WRT for the Gold Cup category in the GT World Challenge Europe Endurance and Sprint Cup series.

Personal life 
Williams is currently studying the bachelor in Computer science in an online course with Perth-based Edith Cowan University.

To amass the funding needed for a racing career in Europe, Williams and his father set up an incorporated company, which investors would be able to buy shares in.

Racing record

Racing career summary 

* Season still in progress.† As Williams was a guest driver, he was ineligible for points.

Complete Western Australian Formula Ford results 
(key) (Races in bold indicate pole position) (Races in italics indicate fastest lap)

Complete Australian Formula 3 Premier Series results 
(key) (Races in bold indicate pole position) (Races in italics indicate fastest lap)

Complete Euroformula Open Championship results 
(key) (Races in bold indicate pole position; races in italics indicate points for the fastest lap of top ten finishers)

Complete Toyota Racing Series results 
(key) (Races in bold indicate pole position) (Races in italics indicate fastest lap)

Complete FIA Formula 3 Championship results 
(key) (Races in bold indicate pole position; races in italics indicate points for the fastest lap of top ten finishers)

Complete FIA Formula 2 Championship results 
(key) (Races in bold indicate pole position) (Races in italics indicate points for the fastest lap of top ten finishers)

Complete GT World Challenge Europe results

GT World Challenge Europe Endurance Cup

* Season still in progress.

GT World Challenge Europe Sprint Cup

* Season still in progress.

References

External links 
 
 
 Driver Profile at FIA Formula 3 Championship
 Driver Profile at Euroformulaopen.net
 Driver Profile at Toyota Racing Series

2000 births
Living people
Australian racing drivers
Australian Formula 3 Championship drivers
Toyota Racing Series drivers
FIA Formula 3 Championship drivers
FIA Formula 2 Championship drivers
Jenzer Motorsport drivers
Racing drivers from Perth, Western Australia
Euroformula Open Championship drivers
Trident Racing drivers
Fortec Motorsport drivers
W Racing Team drivers